The 2005–06 Oklahoma Sooners men's basketball team represented the University of Oklahoma as a member of the Big 12 Conference during the 2005–06 NCAA Division I men's basketball season. The team was led by head coach Kelvin Sampson and played its home games in the Lloyd Noble Center. Oklahoma third in the Big 12 regular season standings behind Texas and Kansas. The Sooners were knocked off in the quarterfinal round of the Big 12 Conference tournament, but received an at-large bid to the NCAA tournament No. 6 seed in the Minneapolis region. The Sooners were upset in the opening round by No. 11 seed UW–Milwaukee to finish the season 20–9 (11–5 Big 12).

Roster

Schedule and results

|-
! colspan=9 style=| Regular season

|-
! colspan=9 style=| Big 12 Tournament

|-
! colspan=9 style=| NCAA Tournament

Rankings

References

Oklahoma Sooners men's basketball seasons
Oklahoma
Oklahoma